The Witch of Botoşani or simply The Witch or The Sorceress (original Yiddish title Di Kishefmakhern) was an 1878, or possibly 1877, play by Abraham Goldfaden. Like most of Goldfaden's major works, it included music.

The play was based on popular superstition; Goldfaden would later remark, "I wrote Di kishefmakhern (The Witch) in Romania, where the populace – Jews as much as Romanians – believe strongly in witches." [Bercovici, 1998] The title role, a female character, was written to be played by a man; it was first played by Israel Grodner. The play survived into a far different era of Yiddish theater: Maurice Schwartz played it at New York City's Yiddish Art Theater in 1925. [Adler, 1999, 107 (commentary)]

Jacob Adler made his 1878 stage debut in the role of the lover Marcus, in a production in Kherson, Ukraine, in which Israel Rosenberg played the title role. [Adler, 1999, 107]

Restoration
In the Fall of 2017, the National Yiddish Theater – Folksbiene of New York staged a revival of The Witch of Botoșani (alternatively 'The Sorceress') as part of their restoration project – an endeavor that will restore lost or nearly lost Yiddish works to the canon of Yiddish culture. A table showing the dates and progress of that restoration effort is shown below.

Workshop performance 
The first performance as part of the Folksbiene's restoration project ran for a sold out week from December 25, 2017 to January 1, 2018. Directed by Motl Didner, musically directed by Zalman Mlotek the cast featured Michael Yashinsky in the title role, Stephanie Lynne Mason, Pat Constant, Steve Sterner, Rachel Botchan, Chelsea Feltman, Kirk Geritano, Emily Hoolihan, Richard Lisenby, Riley McFarland, Raquel Nobile, Bruce Rebold, Gera Sandler, Kayleen Seidl, Lisa Stockman, Bobby Underwood, Tatiana Wechsler.

First full (restored) production 
Two years later, in December 2019, the Folksbiene produced a full production of the restored work. Directed by Motl Didner, musically directed by Zalman Mlotek, and choreographed by Merete Muenter the cast featured Michael Yashinsky in the title role, Mark Alpert, Dani Apple, Rachel Botchan, Jonathan Brody, Rebecca Brudner, Samuel Druhora, Jazmin Gorsline, Peter Gosik, Josh Kohane, Sam Kronenfeld, Riley McFarland, Lexi Rabadi, Bruce Rebold, Hannah D. Scott, Dylan Seders Hoffman, Doug Shapiro, Steve Sterner, and Lorin Zackular.

Previews began on December 1, 2019, opening night was December 9, 2019, and closing performance was December 29, 2019.

References

 Adler, Jacob, A Life on the Stage: A Memoir, translated and with commentary by Lulla Rosenfeld, Knopf, New York, 1999, .
Bercovici, Israil, in O sută de ani de teatru evreiesc în România ("One hundred years of Yiddish/Jewish theater in Romania"), 2nd Romanian-language edition, revised and augmented by Constantin Măciucă. Editura Integral (an imprint of Editurile Universala), Bucharest (1998). .
Partial list of plays by Goldfaden dates the play from 1887, but gives no citation. Bercovici cites a particular performance from 1878 in his comprehensive list of major Yiddish theater premieres in Romania.

Yiddish plays
1878 plays
Witchcraft in written fiction
Literary characters introduced in 1878